Panda Kid, is an Italian garage rock band, founded and currently consist  of songwriter member  Alberto Manfrin,  .Starting in 2010 he released several albums, the last of which is Already Dead Tapes and Fdh music with Lolipop records.  After some European tours and a USA tour in 2015, the Panda Kid band released the single We will be palm available on Slimer Records as Ep.

References

Psychedelic pop music groups